B. R. Sankeerth (born 22 December 1997) is an Indian-born Canadian badminton player. Sankeerth started playing badminton when he was young in Karnataka, India. He had shown his potential as a badminton player by finishing as a runner-up at the U-13 SBM State-ranking junior badminton championship. He clinched two titles at the 2011 Indiranagar 5-Star State-ranking badminton tournament, and was selected to represent India at the 2014 World Junior Championships.

Sankeerth now is part of the Canadian national team. He was a semi-finalist at the BWF Grand Prix event the 2016 Brazil Open in the men's doubles event with Toby Ng - also the runners-up at the 2016 Yonex / K&D Graphics International in the men's doubles event - and in 2017 in the men's singles event.

Achievements

Pan Am Championships 
Men's singles

BWF International Challenge/Series (2 titles, 3 runners-up) 
Men's singles

Men's doubles

  BWF International Challenge tournament
  BWF International Series tournament
  BWF Future Series tournament

References

External links 

 
 

1997 births
Living people
Racket sportspeople from Bangalore
Indian male badminton players
Indian emigrants to Canada
Canadian male badminton players
Canadian sportspeople of Indian descent
Sportspeople from Toronto